Rear Admiral Golam Sadeq is a two-star admiral in Bangladesh Navy and Senior Directing Staff - SDS (Navy) at National Defence College. Prior to that, he was chairman of Bangladesh Inland Water Transport Authority (BIWTA).

Career 
Sadeq was commissioned on 1 July 1989 in Bangladesh Navy. He received naval training from the Royal Malaysian Navy. Later, in his career he served as flag-lieutenant of Navy Chief as staff officer, deputy-director at the planning department of Bangladesh Navy Headquarter, chief staff officer of Commander Chattogram Naval Zone and Commander BN Fleet Staff Officer Operation. In January 2020, he became chairman of BIWTA. Prior to join there, he was commandant of Bangladesh Naval Academy.

References 

Bangladesh Navy personnel
Living people
Bangladeshi Navy admirals